Grant Anthony McBride (29 December 1949 – 12 February 2018) was an Australian politician who was a member of the New South Wales Legislative Assembly representing the electorate of The Entrance on the New South Wales Central Coast for the Labor Party between 1992 and 2011.

Political career 
McBride won Australian Labor Party preselection for The Entrance in the 1991 state election, losing to Liberal incumbent Bob Graham by 116 votes. However, due to the late completion of the 1991 redistribution, hundreds of voters received absentee ballots for Gosford.  As a result, the Court of Disputed Returns ordered a by-election for 1992, which was won by McBride.

In 2003, McBride was appointed Minister for Gaming and Racing and, in 2005, appointed Minister for the Central Coast. As Minister for Gaming and Racing, in 2005, he proposed a ban on Dutch beer Shag, claiming its name was offensive to Australians. McBride said the beer's name linked it, "directly with sexual intercourse". McBride held both Ministerial positions until a controversy arose during 2006, when he was accused of wasting $50,000 on an overseas trip in November 2005. It was alleged that McBride was accompanied by former Gosford City Councillor, Daniel Cook and his former chief of staff (and son of former Police Minister Paul Whelan) John Whelan. Media reports of the incident suggested McBride had taken the trip knowing he might be removed from the Cabinet. McBride lost his position as Minister for Gaming and Racing and Minister for the Central Coast in April 2007.

In May 2007, McBride was appointed Assistant Speaker of the New South Wales Legislative Assembly. On 8 November 2010, McBride announced that he would not contest the 2011 state election.

Personal life and death
McBride was a qualified engineer who worked as an electorate officer to former prime minister, Gough Whitlam.
He was married and lived in The Entrance with his wife and eight children, and was an avowed teetotaller and non-gambler. His daughter, Emma McBride, is the current federal MP for Division of Dobell.

He died on 12 February 2018 from Alzheimer's disease at the age of 68.

References

1949 births
2018 deaths
Deaths from Alzheimer's disease
Deaths from dementia in Australia
Members of the New South Wales Legislative Assembly
Place of birth missing
Australian Labor Party members of the Parliament of New South Wales
Deputy and Assistant Speakers of the New South Wales Legislative Assembly
21st-century Australian politicians